Grady Municipal School District is a school district headquartered in Grady, New Mexico.

The district occupies sections of Curry and Quay counties.

References

External links

 

Education in Curry County, New Mexico
Education in Quay County, New Mexico
School districts in New Mexico